Alan Dennis Metter (December 19, 1942 – June 7, 2020) was an American film director whose most notable credits include Back to School starring Rodney Dangerfield, and Girls Just Want to Have Fun with Sarah Jessica Parker. He also produced and directed the 1983 television special The Winds of Whoopie for Steve Martin. In 1988, he was set to direct Atuk, based on the Mordecai Richler novel The Incomparable Atuk, with Sam Kinison as the title character. The production was shut down early into filming.

Selected filmography
The Winds of Whoopie (1983) (TV)
Girls Just Want to Have Fun (1985)
Back to School (1986)
Moving (1988)
Cold Dog Soup (1990)
Working Tra$h (1990) (TV)
Police Academy: Mission to Moscow (1994)
Billboard Dad (1998)
The Jersey (1999) (TV)
Passport to Paris (1999)
The Growing Pains Movie (2000) (TV)

References

External links

1942 births
2020 deaths
Place of birth missing
American film directors
Comedy film directors